Steve Galloway (born 13 February 1963) is an English football coach and former player. He is currently the assistant manager of Umeå FC.

As a player, Galloway played professionally as a forward in England, Scotland and Sweden.

Playing career
Born in Hannover, West Germany, Galloway played in English non-league football at Sutton United, before moving into the Football League with Crystal Palace in 1984. He spent two seasons with Palace – which included a loan spell at Cambridge United – before joining non-league Maidstone United in 1986. He was brought to the Umeå-based club Tegs SK for the 1987 season in Sweden. His goalscoring ability earned him a contract with Djurgårdens IF – where he stayed for two seasons which included a loan spell in Scotland with St Mirren. In 1990, he returned to Umeå to help local club Umeå FC rise in the Swedish football league.

Coaching career
Galloway has coached Umeå FC, and coached Djurgårdens IF as assistant to Andrée Jeglertz in the 2009 season.

In 2010, he became head coach for Umeå Södra.

After football
Steve filmed two seasons of the hit Swedish show Gladiatorerna as the Timekeeper. Galloway currently lives in Umeå in Sweden, and owns a sport store called Fotbollskliniken and three restaurants.

References

1963 births
Living people
English footballers
Association football forwards
English Football League players
Sutton United F.C. players
Crystal Palace F.C. players
Cambridge United F.C. players
Maidstone United F.C. (1897) players
Djurgårdens IF Fotboll players
St Mirren F.C. players
Umeå FC players
Allsvenskan players
English football managers
Djurgårdens IF Fotboll non-playing staff
English expatriate footballers
Expatriate footballers in Sweden
Expatriate football managers in Sweden
English expatriate football managers